Syllitus papuanus is a species of beetle in the family Cerambycidae. It was described by Gestro in 1875.

References

Stenoderini
Beetles described in 1875